Scintigraphy (from Latin scintilla, "spark"), also known as a gamma scan, is a diagnostic test in nuclear medicine, where radioisotopes attached to drugs that travel to a specific organ or tissue (radiopharmaceuticals) are taken internally and the emitted gamma radiation is captured by external detectors (gamma cameras) to form two-dimensional images in a similar process to the capture of x-ray images. In contrast, SPECT and positron emission tomography (PET) form 3-dimensional images and are therefore classified as separate techniques from scintigraphy, although they also use gamma cameras to detect internal radiation. Scintigraphy is unlike a diagnostic X-ray where external radiation is passed through the body to form an image.

Process

Scintillography is an imaging method of nuclear events provoked by collisions or charged current interactions among nuclear particles or ionizing radiation and atoms which result in a brief, localised pulse of electromagnetic radiation, usually in the visible light range (Cherenkov radiation). This pulse (scintillation) is usually detected and amplified by a photomultiplier or charged coupled device elements, and its resulting electrical waveform is processed by computers to provide two- and three-dimensional images of a subject or region of interest.

Scintillography is mainly used in scintillation cameras in experimental physics. For example, huge neutrino detection underground tanks filled with tetrachloroethylene are surrounded by arrays of photo detectors in order to capture the extremely rare event of a collision between the fluid's atoms and a neutrino.

Another extensive use of scintillography is in medical imaging techniques which use gamma ray detectors called gamma cameras. Detectors coated with materials which scintillate when subjected to gamma rays are scanned with optical photon detectors and scintillation counters. The subjects are injected with special radionuclides which irradiate in the gamma range inside the region of interest, such as the heart or the brain. A special type of gamma camera is the SPECT (Single Photon Emission Computed Tomography). Another medical scintillography technique, the Positron-emission tomography (PET), which uses the scintillations provoked by electron-positron annihilation phenomena.

By organ or organ system

Biliary system (cholescintigraphy)

Scintigraphy of the biliary system is called cholescintigraphy and is done to diagnose  obstruction of the bile ducts by a gallstone (cholelithiasis), a tumor, or another cause. It can also diagnose gallbladder diseases, e.g. bile leaks of biliary fistulas. In cholescintigraphy, the injected radioactive chemical is taken up by the liver and secreted into the bile. The radiopharmaceutical then goes into the bile ducts, the gallbladder, and the intestines. The gamma camera is placed on the abdomen to picture these perfused organs. Other scintigraphic tests are done similarly.

Lung scintigraphy

The most common indication for lung scintigraphy is to diagnose pulmonary embolism, e.g. with a ventilation/perfusion scan and may be appropriate for excluding PE in pregnancy. Less common indications include evaluation of lung transplantation, preoperative evaluation, evaluation of right-to-left shunts.

In the ventilation phase of a ventilation/perfusion scan, a gaseous radionuclide xenon or technetium DTPA in an aerosol form (or ideally using Technegas, a radioaerosol invented in Australia by Dr Bill Burch and Dr Richard Fawdry) is inhaled by the patient through a mouthpiece or mask that covers the nose and mouth. The perfusion phase of the test involves the intravenous injection of radioactive technetium macro aggregated albumin (Tc99m-MAA). A gamma camera acquires the images for both phases of the study.

Bone

For example, the ligand methylene-diphosphonate (MDP) can be preferentially taken up by bone. By chemically attaching technetium-99m to MDP, radioactivity can be transported and attached to bone via the hydroxyapatite for imaging. Any increased physiological function, such as a fracture in the bone, will usually mean increased concentration of the tracer.

Heart
A thallium stress test is a form of scintigraphy, where the amount of thallium-201 detected in cardiac tissues correlates with tissue blood supply. Viable cardiac cells have normal Na+/K+ ion exchange pumps. Thallium binds the K+ pumps and is transported into the cells. Exercise or dipyridamole induces widening (vasodilation) of normal coronary arteries. This produces coronary steal from areas of ischemia where arteries are already maximally dilated. Areas of infarct or ischemic tissue will remain "cold". Pre- and post-stress thallium may indicate areas that will benefit from myocardial revascularization. Redistribution indicates the existence of coronary steal and the presence of ischemic coronary artery disease.

Parathyroid

Tc99m-sestamibi is used to detect parathyroid adenomas.

Thyroid

To detect metastases/function of thyroid, the isotopes technetium-99m or iodine-123 are generally used, and for this purpose the iodide isotope does not need to be attached to another protein or molecule, because thyroid tissue takes up free iodide actively.

Renal and urinary systems

Full body
Examples are gallium scans, indium white blood cell scans, iobenguane scan (MIBG) and octreotide scans. The MIBG scan detects adrenergic tissue and thus can be used to identify the location of tumors such as pheochromocytomas and neuroblastomas.

Function tests
Certain tests, such as the Schilling test and urea breath test, use radioisotopes but are not used to produce a specific image.

History
Scintigraphic scanning was invented and proven by Neurologist and Radiologist professor dr. Bernard George Ziedses des Plantes. He presented the results in 1950 under the name 'indirect  Autoradiograph’. In 1970, the Physikalisch-Medizinische Gesellschaft für Neuroradiologie (The Physics and Medical Society) instituted the ‘Ziedses des Plantes Medal'. It was first awarded to W. Oldendorf en G. Hounsfield in 1974 for  Computer Tomography (CT). Later, in 1985, the medal was awarded to Ziedses des Plantes himself. In 1977 he received The Roentgen Medal.

See also 
Gamma camera
Medical imaging
Nuclear medicine

References

External links 

Scintigraphy